Landore is the name of an electoral ward in the City and County of Swansea, Wales, UK.

Description
Landore is bounded by the wards of Castle to the south west; Cwmbwrla to the west; Mynydd-Bach to the north west; Morriston to the north; Bonymaen to the east; and St. Thomas to the south east.

The electoral ward consists of some or all of the following areas: Castle Graig, Brynhyfryd, Hafod, Landore, Morfa and Plasmarl, in the parliamentary constituency of Swansea East.  However the Landore ward can be split into three chief areas from north to south: Plasmarl, Landore and Hafod.

For electoral purposes, Landore is divided into a number of polling districts: Plasmarl, Cnap Llwyd, Glandwr and Hafod.

The Elected Councillors for the Landore Ward are Cllr Viv Abbott (Liberal Democrat) and Cllr Rob Speht (Liberal Democrat).

Districts
Landore
Landore is a residential area.  It has seen a number of new developments during the early millennium decade, such as the Liberty Stadium, now the Swansea.com Stadium, which opened in 2005 and a new out-of-town retail park built around the same time.

Morfa
Morfa is a former area of light industry, which is now dominated by a retail park in the north western part of the ward.

Hafod
Hafod is a small area to the far south of the ward.

2012 local council elections
For the 2012 local council elections, the turnout in Landore was 35.10%.  The results were:

Swansea County Borough Council
Landore was one of the ten wards created to Swansea County Borough Council, electing two representatives in the November 1889 elections.

See also
Lower Swansea valley

References

External links
Hafod & The Swansea Valley Archeological Trail 
Archaeology in Wales:Yorkshire Imperial Metals Site, Landore, Swansea 2002
Local Councillor website

Swansea electoral wards